Veep is an American political satire comedy television series, that premiered on HBO on April 22, 2012. The series was created by Armando Iannucci as an adaptation of the British sitcom The Thick of It.

Veep is set in the office of Selina Meyer (Julia Louis-Dreyfus), a fictional Vice President, and subsequent President, of the United States.

Veep has received critical acclaim and won several major awards, including seventeen Primetime Emmy Awards, two Critics' Choice Television Awards, four Screen Actors Guild Awards, two TCA Awards, three Writers Guild of America Awards, one Peabody Award, and has been nominated for seven Golden Globe Awards.

Emmy Awards
Awarded since 1949, the Primetime Emmy Award is an annual accolade bestowed by members of the Academy of Television Arts & Sciences recognizing outstanding achievements in American prime time television programming. As of 2017, Veep has won seventeen awards from a total of fifty-nine nominations.

Primetime Emmy Awards

Critics' Choice Television Awards
The Critics' Choice Television Award is an annual accolade bestowed by the Broadcast Television Journalists Association in recognition of outstanding achievements in television, since 2011. As of 2016, Veep has won two awards from a total of thirteen nominations.

Directors Guild of America Awards
The Directors Guild of America Award is an annual accolade bestowed by the Directors Guild of America in recognition of outstanding achievements in film and television directing, since 1938.  As of 2018, Veep has won three awards.

Golden Globe Awards
The Golden Globe Award is an annual accolade bestowed by members of the Hollywood Foreign Press Association recognizing outstanding achievements in film and television, since 1944.  As of 2017, Veep has been nominated for seven awards.

Producers Guild of America Awards
The Producers Guild of America Award is an annual accolade bestowed by the Producers Guild of America in recognition of outstanding achievements in film and television producing, since 1990.  As of 2018, Veep has been nominated for five awards.

Satellite Awards
The Satellite Award is an annual accolade bestowed by members of the International Press Academy recognizing outstanding achievements in film and television.  As of 2018, Veep has a total of ten nominations.

Screen Actors Guild Awards
Awarded since 1995, the Screen Actors Guild Award is an annual accolade bestowed by members of SAG-AFTRA recognizing outstanding achievements in acting in television.  As of 2018, Veep has won four awards from a total of ten nominations.

Television Critics Association Awards
The TCA Awards are an annual accolade bestowed by the Television Critics Association in recognition of outstanding achievements in television.  As of 2017, Veep has won two awards from a total of ten nominations.

Writers Guild of America Awards
The Writers Guild of America Award is an annual accolade bestowed by the Writers Guild of America in recognition of outstanding achievements in film, television, and radio, since 1949.  As of 2018, Veep has won three awards from a total of eight nominations.

References

External links
 List of Primetime Emmy Awards and nominations received by Veep
 List of awards and nominations received by Veep at the Internet Movie Database

Veep (TV series)
Veep